Girona FC Femení is a football team from Girona, the women's section of Girona FC. The senior team was refounded in 2017 after a period of four years in which Girona were only by female teams at represented at youth level.

History
Although Girona FC operated a senior women's team for a number of years, financial constraints had forced them to resign to its place in Segunda División in 2013 and to cease operations in 2016. In 2017 the Catalan club operated just 3 junior teams with a total of 41 youth players in their system. The announcement came less than two months before Girona itself was acquired by a consortium including City Football Group, a worldwide football organisation known for its support of women's football, though an explicit link between the two events was never made. The club also announced a simultaneous expansion of the female youth section.

Girona FC Femení came back to the competition in 2017–18, in the second division of the Catalan regional leagues, the fifth tier of women's football in Spain, where they finished second to narrowly miss out on promotion which the club had initially announced was their immediate goal. In 2018–19 they again finished second, but were still promoted to the Primera Catalana.

Season to season

References

External links
Girona FC Femení on the Catalan Football Federation website

Women's football clubs in Spain
Association football clubs established in 2017
Football clubs in Catalonia
2017 establishments in Spain
Girona FC